Spangle Lake is a small alpine lake in Elmore County, Idaho, United States, located in the Sawtooth Mountains in the Sawtooth National Recreation Area.  The lake is located at the intersection Sawtooth National Forest trails 462, 463, and 460.

Spangle Lake is in the Sawtooth Wilderness, and a wilderness permit can be obtained at a registration box at trailheads or wilderness boundaries.  Little Spangle Lake is just downstream of Spangle Lake while Lake Ingeborg is just upstream.
The Spangle lakes are the origin of the Middle Fork of the Boise River.

References

See also
 List of lakes of the Sawtooth Mountains (Idaho)
 Sawtooth National Forest
 Sawtooth National Recreation Area
 Sawtooth Range (Idaho)

Lakes of Idaho
Lakes of Elmore County, Idaho
Glacial lakes of the United States
Glacial lakes of the Sawtooth Wilderness